The 2014–15 Oral Roberts Golden Eagles men's basketball team represented Oral Roberts University during the 2014–15 NCAA Division I men's basketball season. The Golden Eagles were led by 16th year head coach Scott Sutton and played their home games at the Mabee Center. They were members of The Summit League. They return to The Summit after only two seasons in the Southland Conference. They finished the season 19–15, 10–6 in The Summit League play to finish in third place. They advanced to the semifinals of  The Summit League tournament where they lost to North Dakota State. They were invited to the College Basketball Invitational where they defeated UC Santa Barbara in the first round before losing in the second round to Loyola–Chicago.

Roster
Source

Schedule
Source

|-
!colspan=9 style="background:#000080; color:#D4AF37;"| Exhibition

|-
!colspan=9 style="background:#000080; color:#D4AF37;"| Regular season

|-
!colspan=9 style="background:#000080; color:#D4AF37;"| The Summit League tournament

|-
!colspan=9 style="background:#000080; color:#D4AF37;"| College Basketball Invitational

* The December 7 game vs Missouri State was postponed due to a power outage.

References

Oral Roberts Golden Eagles men's basketball seasons
Oral Roberts
Oral Roberts
2014 in sports in Oklahoma
2015 in sports in Oklahoma